Tamás Darnyi (born 3 June 1967 in Budapest) is a Hungarian retired male swimmer. He is considered by many to be one of the greatest medley swimmers in history. He won four gold medals at two Olympic Games (1988 and 1992) and was unbeaten in the individual medley events from 1985 until his retirement in 1993. He is the first swimmer ever to swim the 200 m medley (long course) in less than 2 minutes.

Career
Possibly one of the greatest medley swimmers of all time, Tamás Darnyi dominated his speciality between 1985 and 1993. He won the 200/400 m medley double at the 1988 and 1992 Olympics, the 1986 and 1991 World Championships, and the 1985, 1987 and 1989 European Championships. He also won a European title in the 200 m butterfly, and a world bronze in the same event.

A teen talent, Darnyi might have competed at the 1984 Olympics, but both the Eastern European boycott and a personal accident prevented this. He was hit by a snowball in the left eye, which left him blind in one eye. After recovering, he started an unbeaten streak in medley events that lasted from 1985 to 1993. During that period, he bettered the world record in both medley events three times. After his final European title in 1993 (400 medley), he retired and managed a Budapest sports school.

He was named Male World Swimmer of the Year in 1987 and 1991 by Swimming World magazine. He was elected Hungarian Sportsman of the Year in 1986, 1987, 1988, 1990 and 1992 for his achievements.

See also
 List of members of the International Swimming Hall of Fame
World record progression 200 metres medley
World record progression 400 metres medley
List of multiple Olympic gold medalists

References

External links
Tamas Darnyi (in Hungarian)

1967 births
Living people
Hungarian male swimmers
Male medley swimmers
Olympic swimmers of Hungary
Swimmers at the 1988 Summer Olympics
Swimmers at the 1992 Summer Olympics
Swimmers from Budapest
Olympic gold medalists for Hungary
World record setters in swimming
World Aquatics Championships medalists in swimming
European Aquatics Championships medalists in swimming
European champions for Hungary
Medalists at the 1992 Summer Olympics
Medalists at the 1988 Summer Olympics
Olympic gold medalists in swimming